Alexandrovsky District  is an administrative and municipal district (raion), one of the sixteen in Tomsk Oblast, Russia. It is located in the northwest of the oblast and borders with the territory of Strezhevoy Town Under Oblast Jurisdiction, with Kargasoksky District, and with Khanty–Mansi Autonomous Okrug. Population: 8,686 (2010 Census);  —the second least populated in Tomsk Oblast (after Teguldetsky District). The population of Alexandrovskoye accounts for 83.0% of the district's total population.

Geography
The Ob River splits the district in two parts and serves as the main means of transportation. The majority of the district's inhabited localities are located along the Ob. The Kievsky Yogan is one of the main tributaries of the Ob in the district.

History
The district was established in 1923 as a part of Tobolsk Okrug of Ural Oblast.

Economy
Twenty-two proven oil fields are located on the territory of the district, as well as natural gas and combustible peat deposits. There are no ground links to either Tomsk or the cities in Khanty–Mansi Autonomous Okrug; communication is possible via air or river transportation.

Demographics
As of 2007, ethnic Russians formed the majority with 80%, followed by Germans at 9%, and Khant-Selkups at 4.8%.

References

Notes

Sources

Districts of Tomsk Oblast